Israeli Academy of Film and Television is a non-profit organization working in the fields of film and television in Israel.

History
The Israeli Academy of Film and Television, founded in 1990, is the Israeli equivalent of the US-based Academy of Television Arts & Sciences. In 2012, it had 750 members.

Governance
The organization's board includes representatives of content creators, the film and television industry, representatives of local authorities and public figures. In 2012, the board was chaired by the producer Eitan Even and had 22 members.

Awards
Each year the academy gives the Israeli Film Academy Award, known as the Ophir Award, for outstanding Israeli films.

From 2003, the academy added a separate ceremony for television, known as the Awards of the Israeli Television Academy.

References

External links 
  

Film organizations in Israel
Television organizations in Israel
Organizations established in 1990
1990 establishments in Israel